Sean Marshall may refer to:

Sean Marshall (actor) (born 1965), American former actor and singer
Sean Marshall (baseball) (born 1982), American baseball player.
Sean Marshall (basketball) (born 1985), American basketball player

See also
Shaun Marshall (born 1978), English footballer